Ralph Hayward Young (December 17, 1889 – January 23, 1962) was an American football player, coach of football and basketball, college athletics administrator, and state legislator. He was the head football coach at DePauw University (1915), Kalamazoo College (1916–1917, 1919–1922), and Michigan Agricultural College/Michigan State College, now Michigan State University, (1923–1927) During his career as a head coach, he compiled record of 56–41–3, including an 18–22–1 mark at Michigan Agricultural/State. Young was also the head basketball coach at DePauw during the 1915–16 season and Kalamazoo from 1916 to 1923, tallying a career college basketball mark of 100–45. In addition, he served as Michigan State's first athletic director, from 1923 until 1954.

Young served three terms in the Michigan Legislature, representing the East Lansing district. He died on January 23, 1962, at his home in East Lansing, Michigan.

In 1962, he was elected to the Michigan Sports Hall of Fame. He was elected to the National Association of Collegiate Directors of Athletics Hall of Fame in 1979 and the Kalamazoo College Hall of Fame in 1986.

Head coaching record

References

External links
 

1889 births
1962 deaths
20th-century American politicians
American football fullbacks
Basketball coaches from Indiana
Chicago Maroons football players
DePauw Tigers football coaches
DePauw Tigers men's basketball coaches
Kalamazoo Hornets football coaches
Kalamazoo Hornets men's basketball coaches
Michigan State Spartans athletic directors
Michigan State Spartans football coaches
Members of the Michigan House of Representatives
People from Crown Point, Indiana